A Sense of Loss is an album by the progressive rock band Nosound, released on Kscope.

The main release came in a DVD featuring the music formatted for the 5.1 surround sound system with 24bit (high quality) mixes of the songs. It introduced an alternate version of Fading Silently with an extended guitar solo. It also included song videos, a picture, and a video gallery.

Track listing

Personnel 
 Giancarlo Erra – vocals, guitar, keyboards
 Paolo Martelacci  – keyboards, vocals
 Paolo Vigliarolo  – acoustic guitar
 Alessandro Luci  – bass guitar
 Gigi Zito  – percussion, vocals

References

External links
www.nosound.net official band site
official myspace site
official ASoL album site
official lightdark album site

Nosound albums
2009 albums